The Electoral district of County of Bathurst was an electorate of the New South Wales Legislative Council at a time when some of its members were elected and the balance were appointed by the Governor.

It was created by the 1843 Electoral Districts Act and returned one member. The towns of Bathurst, Kelso and Carcoar were removed from the district with the expansion of the Council in 1851 and became the district of Western Boroughs.

In 1856 the unicameral Legislative Council was abolished and replaced with an elected Legislative Assembly and an appointed Legislative Council. The district was represented by the Legislative Assembly electorate of Bathurst.

Members

Election results

1843

1848

1851

See also
Members of the New South Wales Legislative Council, 1843–1851 and 1851-1856

References

Former electoral districts of New South Wales Legislative Council
1843 establishments in Australia
1856 disestablishments in Australia